Leaveism (leavism) is a term first coined in 2013 by Dr Ian Hesketh, a researcher at University of Manchester - in the UK, to describe the phenomena of employees using flexitime, annual leave, rest days and other leave entitlement schemes to have time off when they are in fact too unwell to go to work. He later extended this to include occasions whereby employees took work home and/or on holiday that they could not complete in paid working hours. Hesketh's research, which centred on well-being in the UK police service, sought to identify a gap in current thinking around absenteeism and presenteeism; of which there is a plethora of academic study and commentary. The aim of his studies was to highlight that the true extent of sickness absence may be masked by the practice of leaveism, and that there may be a hidden populace experiencing significant workload overload.

Definition
Leaveism is the practice of:

 employees using allocated time off such as annual leave entitlements, flexi hours banked, re-rostered rest days and so on, to take time off when they are in fact unwell;
 employees using these leave entitlements to look after dependents, including children and/or elderly relatives;
 employees taking work home that cannot be completed in normal working hours;
 employees working while not at work, on leave or holiday to catch up.

Additional research
In a later paper Hesketh et al. explored the relationship of leaveism with aspects of work-life balance, or integration as he preferred to call it; and the extent to which the practice existed amongst senior police officers.
Hesketh and Cooper are currently researching the second aspect of leaveism, associated with using time off such as annual leave, flexitime and other rest day allocations to look after dependents, including both children and elderly relatives; the so-called sandwich generation. The global pandemic of COVID-19 has highlighted this aspect as schools around the world close down in attempts to reduce the spread of the virus. Again, the consequences of this are that employees are vulnerable to workload overload, which may, over time, have major health implications to those individuals. This may also impact on workplace outcomes, such as lost productivity and/or reduced performance and efficiency. This work also looks at the implications for resilience, engagement and discretionary effort which is discussed in depth in Hesketh and Cooper's book Managing Health and Wellbeing in the Public Sector

Extent and factors
In support, research carried out by Gerich (n=930) suggested that fear of job loss or downgrading and low perceived job gratification appeared to increase the likelihood of the first element of leaveism. 

In the CIPD Wellbeing Survey of 2021  the overwhelming majority of respondents (84%) have observed ‘presenteeism’, both in the workplace (75%) and while working at home (77%), over the past 12 months. Further, seven in ten (70%) have observed some form of ‘leaveism’, such as working outside contracted hours or using holiday entitlement to work, over the past 12 months.  Whilst it was reported that more organisations are taking steps to address both ‘presenteeism’ and ‘leaveism’ compared with last year, although over two-fifths of those experiencing these issues are not taking any action (43% for those experiencing presenteeism; 47% in the case of leaveism). 
Leaveism is also cited in the BBC publication aptly named,'The 101 people, ideas and things changing how we work today' published in July 2019.

Leaveism in police forces
Findings from a national survey of police officers in the UK carried out in 2016 (n= 16,841) for the Police Federation of England and Wales noted that 59% of respondents had used annual leave, flexi time or rest days to have time away from the workplace due to the state of their physical health, and 42% had done the same due to psychological health conditions. Furthermore, the same survey reported 50% of respondents conceded they had taken work home that could not have completed in normal working hours, and 40% had worked while on holiday or annual leave in order to catch up with outstanding work.

On a 2017 study visit to the United States, Hesketh noted a further manifestation in respect of US police patrol officers taking vacation allocations to mask sickness. In some of these cases it was in order to negate complaints or criticisms of working additional duties or employment outside of their police department. A culture of long hours and relatively high wages drove officers to use their own vacation time if suffering ill health to continue on additional paid work that was not as emotionally taxing or physically demanding.

Risk factors
The CIPD and Simply Health, following research with over 1,000 HR professionals representing 4.6m employees in the UK, reported that 87% considered that technology affected people's ability to switch off out of work hours (element 4 of leaveism), taking phone calls and answering emails were cited by way of example. Further, that 69% had observed leaveism over the last 12 months. A link to the report, Health and Well-being at Work, can be found here.  

A report by Deloitte in Jan 2020, titled Mental health and employers -  Refreshing the case for investment detailed a 'deep dive' into leaveism. It modelled numerous studies conducted over recent years and highlighted the criticality of the phenomena in understanding employees workplace responses to stress and ill-health. The report concluded that younger employees were more susceptible to leaveism and, as such, required more support. The report also made recommendations about what organisations could practically do to reduce the associated risks of leaveism behaviours. Steps such as setting clear boundaries between work and personal time, enabling policy-driven culture change and encouraging people to take their annual leave allocation to switch off and relax.

Covid-19
March 2020 saw a distinct change in leaveism behaviours, with the impact of COVID-19 striking hard. Employees isolating and shielding largely ceased to use allocated time off when unwell, element 1 of the practice. Conversely, there appears to be an enormous rise in a version of elements 3 and 4, in that employees are working incredibly long hours on Zoom, Teams, FaceTime and Skype calls without a break. Many seeing their workloads rise exponentially. The National Forum for Health and Wellbeing  noted the propensity for employees to conduct back to back online meetings without a break for very long hours throughout the working day and well beyond. The impact of which inhibits exercise and healthy living generally. They also witnessed employees effectively working from bed when they were unwell. Hesketh & Cooper are currently engaged on a study of these behaviours and will report late 2020.

See also
 Sick leave
 Absenteeism
 Presenteeism

References

Industrial and organizational psychology
Working time
Workplace